Jean Panisse (17 March 1928 – 1 January 2021) was a French actor.

Acting career 
Panisse debuted his acting career by starring in the French movie .<ref>{{Citation|last=Péclet|first=Georges|title=Les révoltés du Danaé|date=1952-11-07|url=https://www.imdb.com/title/tt0142816/|type=Comedy, Drama|others=Guy Alland, Henri Arius, Robert Berri, Jean Berton|publisher=Société Française de Production (SFP)|access-date=2021-01-04}}</ref>

Death 
Panisse died from complications of COVID-19 on 1 January 2021, at the age of 92, during the COVID-19 pandemic in France.

Selected filmography
 Napoleon Road (1953)

References

External links 

1928 births
2021 deaths
20th-century French male actors
21st-century French male actors
Male actors from Marseille
Deaths from the COVID-19 pandemic in France